Pinnacle Peak  may refer to:

Mountains

United States
 Pinnacle Peak (Arizona), in Scottsdale
 Pinnacle Peak (Montana), a mountain in Powell County
 Pinnacle Peak (King County, Washington), in the Cascade Range
 Pinnacle Peak (Lewis County, Washington), in Mount Rainier National Park
 Pinnacle Peak (Whatcom County, Washington), in North Cascades National Park

Other countries
 Pinnacle Peak (Yukon), in the Saint Elias Mountains, Canada
 Pinnacle Peak (Ladakh), in Jammu and Kashmir, India

Other uses
 Pinnacle Peak Pictures, an American evangelical Christian film studio

See also
 Pinnacle (disambiguation)
 The Pinnacles (disambiguation)